Aleksandra Wójcik (born ) is a Polish female volleyball player. She was part of the Poland women's national volleyball team.

She participated at the 2013 FIVB World Grand Prix, 2014 FIVB World Grand Prix and 2015 FIVB World Grand Prix. On club level she played for Legionovia SA in 2014.

References

External links
 Profile at FIVB.org

1994 births
Living people
Polish women's volleyball players
People from Kamienna Góra